Agata Parahina (born 9 August 1999, Ishimbay, Russia) is a Russian international draughts player and a current world champion in the women's biltz event. She emerged as the winner of the blitz category during the 2019 Women's World Draughts Championship. Agata also became the third draughts player from the Republic of Bashkortostan to win a world championship title.

References 

Bashkir people
1999 births
Russian draughts players
Players of international draughts
Living people
People from Ishimbay
Sportspeople from Bashkortostan